Mehragan-e Bala (also Romanized as Mehragān-e Bālā; also known as Mehragān, Mehrakān, Mehrakān-e Bālā, Mehrkān, and Mihrakān) is a village in Howmeh Rural District, in the Central District of Bandar Lengeh County, Hormozgan Province, Iran. At the 2006 census, its population was 702, in 138 families.

References 

Populated places in Bandar Lengeh County